James Balog (pronounced BAY-log; born July 15, 1952) is an American photographer whose work explores the relationship between humans and nature. He is the founder and director of Earth Vision Institute in Boulder, Colorado.

Balog's photographs have appeared in National Geographic, The New Yorker, Life, Vanity Fair, The New York Times Magazine, Smithsonian, Audubon, Outside and numerous trade publications such as American Photo, Professional Photographer and Photo District News. 

He was a contributing editor to National Geographic Adventure. Assignments and personal projects have included documenting the aftermath of the 1980 eruption of Mount St. Helens, the 2004 tsunami that devastated Southeast Asia, Hurricane Katrina's collision with the U.S. Gulf Coast, and the 2010 Deepwater Horizon Gulf oil disaster.

Balog has received many awards for his work. In 1996, he became the first photographer ever commissioned by the U.S. Postal Service to create a full set of stamps. He is the author of seven books, including Extreme Ice Now: Vanishing Glaciers and Changing Climate: A Progress Report (2009), Tree: A New Vision of the American Forest (2004), and Survivors: A New Vision of Endangered Wildlife (1990), described as a conceptual breakthrough in nature photography.

He is a founding Fellow of the International League of Conservation Photographers. He lives in Boulder, Colorado, with his wife, Suzanne, and his daughter.

Early life and education 
Balog was born in Danville, Pennsylvania. His interest and fascination with nature originated in his early childhood in New Jersey and Pennsylvania. While working on his undergraduate degree in communications at Boston College, he became an avid adventurer. He made frequent trips to the White Mountains of New Hampshire and the wilderness rivers of Maine, and later larger climbing expeditions in the Alps and Himalayas, along with first ascents in Alaska.

As his outdoor adventures evolved, Balog increasingly felt a need to document his experiences. He began carrying a camera on his trips and teaching himself photography. While working on a master's degree in geomorphology at the University of Colorado, he honed his photography skills during frequent climbing trips. n order to pursue a more direct connection with the natural world, he decided to switch from science to nature photojournalism. He began with a series of documentary photography assignments for magazines such as Mariah (the predecessor to Outside), Smithsonian and National Geographic, work he continues today. Later, he moved into self-directed projects, many of which would ultimately lead to large-format photography books.

Photography 
Since the early 1980s, Balog has photographed subjects such as endangered animals, North America's old-growth forests, and polar ice. His work aims to combine insights from art and science to produce innovative interpretations of our changing world.Balog's best-known project explores the impact of climate change on the world's glaciers.  In 2007, he initiated the Extreme Ice Survey, the most wide-ranging ground-based photographic glacier study ever conducted. National Geographic magazine showcased Balog's ice work in June 2007  and June 2010, and the project is featured in the 2009 NOVA documentary Extreme Ice as well as the 75-minute film Chasing Ice, which premiered in January 2012. Balog's book Ice: Portraits of the World’s Vanishing Glaciers summarizes the work of the Extreme Ice Survey through 2012.

In January 2016, Balog began production on a feature-length documentary film, exploring the environmental effects of the Anthropocene. Under the name The Human Element, the film debuted in April 2018, co-presented by Green Film Fest, part of the San Francisco International Film Festival.

Documentary films 

The Human Element is a 2018 documentary film directed by Matthew Testa and produced by Olivia Ahnemann.

Chasing Ice is a 2012 documentary film directed by Jeff Orlowski about the efforts of Balog and his Extreme Ice Survey to publicize the effects of climate change. It was released in the United States on November 16, 2012. The documentary includes scenes from a glacier calving event that took place at Jakobshavn Glacier in Greenland, lasting 75 minutes, the longest such event ever captured on film. Two EIS videographers waited several weeks in a small tent overlooking the glacier, and were finally able to witness  of ice crashing off the glacier.

The film received the 2014 News and Documentary Emmy Award for Outstanding Nature Programming.

Books 
 The Human Element: A Time Capsule from the Anthropocene, (Rizzoli, 2021) ISBN  084787088XWildlife Requiem (International Center of Photography, New York, 1984) ISBN 0-933642-06-7
 Ice: Portraits of the World's Vanishing Glaciers (Rizzoli, 2012) ISBN 978-0847838868
 Extreme Ice Now: Vanishing Glaciers and Changing Climate: A Progress Report (National Geographic Books, Washington DC, 2009) ISBN 978-1-4262-0401-2
 Tree: A New Vision of the American Forest (Barnes & Noble Books, New York, 2004) ISBN 978-1-4027-2818-1
 Animal (Graphis, New York, 1999) ISBN 978-1-888001-80-8
 James Balog’s Animals A to Z (Chronicle, San Francisco, 1996) ISBN 978-0-8118-1339-6
 Anima (Arts Alternative Press, Boulder, Colo., 1993) ISBN 0-9636266-0-4
 Survivors: A New Vision of Endangered Wildlife (Harry N. Abrams, New York, 1990) ISBN 0-8109-3908-8

Notable projects
The Extreme Ice Survey (EIS) tells the story of a planet in flux. With methodology that combines time-lapse imagery with conventional photography and video, EIS, now in its second decade of field operations, is the world's most extensive ground-based photographic glacier study to date. Over a million time-lapse frames reveal the extraordinary retreat of glaciers and ice sheets due to climate change, providing scientists with vital insights on glacier dynamics. As of January 2018, 28 cameras were shooting at glaciers in Greenland, Iceland, Alaska, the Alps, Antarctica, and the Rocky Mountains of the U.S.; previously, as many as 43 cameras had been in the field at once. The cameras shoot year-round, every half-hour of daylight. EIS supplements the time-lapse record by occasionally repeating shots at fixed locations in Iceland, Bolivia, the Canadian province of British Columbia, Mt. Everest, Mt. Kilimanjaro and the French and Swiss Alps.

A feature-length film, PBS documentary, National Geographic book, National Public Radio and numerous magazines and newspapers have shown the EIS team. In addition, EIS spreads the word of climate change and shrinking glaciers through public talks, a touring exhibition and displays in public venues, including Denver International Airport, Chicago O'Hare International Airport, and Atlanta Hartsfield International Airport. EIS has appeared before Congress and in multimedia presentations at science and policy conferences around the world.

ANIMA series. Balog paired chimpanzees with a diverse range of humans and photographed a series of portraits. The artwork draws on insights from a variety of fields, including visual arts, environmental philosophy and Jungian psychology. ANIMA asks readers to imagine a healthier, more integrated relationship between humans and nature.

Starting in 1997 and continuing intermittently through the present day, Balog has continued a series of photographs made with a Holga camera, a toy appreciated for its low-fidelity aesthetic. Balog enjoys working with the imperfections in the exposures, such as vignetting and blur, and makes it part of the finished "look." makes them part of the pieces. He actually wants the camera to produce little defects that will inspire new creative revelations.

Survivors series. Balog tried to change people's perception of endangered wildlife by altering the context in which the animals were viewed. Instead of capturing his subjects in nature with a telephoto lens, he photographed them in non-natural settings, often against white backdrops, to emphasize their vulnerability.

Balog explored the increasing dependence of Homo sapiens on technology in his series "Techno Sapiens". Its images range from techno-fashion portraits to photographs depicting people's techno-habitats. Balog used a variety of techniques to create images that illustrate the changing features of human nature, as well as humankind's increasing detachment from the natural world. The duality of the pictures, a tension between beauty and horror, mimics the ambivalence most people feel for technology.

For the Tree series, Balog wanted to photograph some of world's tallest trees in their full grandeur, but he realized that his subjects were far too large to capture in a single frame. He devised a multi-frame approach of photographing the trees from the top down. The method was inspired by some of the lunar landing pictures from the NASA missions during the 1960s. Balog climbed each tree, and then photographed it in sections as he rappelled downward. Later, he created digital mosaics by stitching the images together using computer imaging software. Some images required up to four days of shooting, plus as many as six weeks of computer work to assemble the final composition. The tree images eventually became a 2004 book, Tree: A New Vision of the American Forest.

Style and inspiration 
Balog's work has primarily evolved as a combination of art, science and environmental documentary. He views his imagery as exploring the "contact zone" between man and nature. David Holbrooke's 2006 documentary film A Redwood Grows in Brooklyn explores his thoughts about art, nature and perception.

I’ve basically devoted my career to looking at the relationship between humans and nature. I want to do what I can to shift human understanding of who we are and what we are and how we should relate to all the rest of what’s on this planet. I want to crack through the veneer of the illusions that surround us and see inside reality more purely than you normally get to see. That’s the real witchcraft and voodoo of this artistic process we’re in. I hope that the work helps people to think and see differently—and ultimately, we can only hope, behave differently.

Balog views photography as a form of visual evidence that can influence people's perception of the world around them:

I’ve believed for a long time that photographers are like the antennae of civilization. We are an integral part of the sensing mechanism of the human animal. We are out there feeling in the darkness, trying to see what’s around us and reveal what hasn’t been revealed before. Not all photographers work that way, but to me that’s one of the central elements of photography. I would like to think that passionate, involved photographers would be looking at the world and trying their hardest to speak about the important things that are going on today.

Among his many artistic influences Balog counts Irving Penn, Richard Avedon, Carleton Watkins, William Henry Jackson, Edward Weston, Robert Adams, Eliot Porter, Eugene Smith and Cornell Capa. Outside photography, he draws inspiration from the entire range of arts, including music, literature, painting, filmmaking, sculpture and architecture.

Early in his career, Balog concentrated on man's direct impact on nature, producing a series on nuclear missile silos in the agrarian landscapes of the American West. In his first book project, Wildlife Requiem, Balog examined the killing of animals for sport. Published in 1984, Wildlife Requiem shocked the photography establishment with its brutally graphic images.

In a lot of my work I’m trying to make a commentary about humans encroaching on nature through their presence. But I’m not so naïve as to think that my own presence is not an impact on the animals and plants and landscapes that I happen to enter. What I can do as a photographer, hopefully, is to help everybody else see their impact in a way that maybe they hadn’t before.

See Also
 Conservation photography

Notes

References

External Links
 James Balog Photography
 
 

1952 births
American photographers
Living people
Nature photographers
Boston College alumni
Sierra Club awardees